Butterfield Market is an upscale grocery store with its original store located at 1114 Lexington Avenue. On September 2, 2020, it opened its second store located at 1150 Madison Avenue, also in the Upper East Side neighborhood of the borough of Manhattan in New York City. It is named for the old telephone exchange name for the neighborhood, Butterfield 8.   Butterfield cites a founding date of 1915 as a small grocery store, though an article in The New York Times cites its founding as a produce stand in 1926 at the corner of Lexington and 78th Street, across the street from its current first location.  According to the Times, it was founded by an Italian grocer whose name is lost to history.  Neighborhood customers have included Brooke Astor, John D. Rockefeller, and Bette Davis.  The market once flew in 100 boxes of strawberries for a Christmas party thrown by Davis.  The fictional character Trudy Campbell on the television show Mad Men is also a customer of Butterfield, as revealed in the episode "Souvenir".

References

Upper East Side
1915 establishments in New York City